Zsolt Daczi (June 12, 1969 – August 6, 2007) was a Hungarian guitarist. He was born in Kiskunhalas, Hungary.

He was a member of Hungarian rock band Bikini and heavy metal band Omen. He also founded a project (Carpathia Project), and he also played in a heavy metal band called Tirana Rockers.

Daczi fought with cancer in his last years. In the end, he was unable to play on stage. He died in Budapest. He was 38 years old.

Bands
1989–1992: Bikini
1993–1999: Tirana Rockers
1997–2004: Bikini
1999: Carpathia Project
2002–2007: Omen

External links 
 Hungarian Wikipedia page

1969 births
2007 deaths
Hungarian rock guitarists
Male guitarists
20th-century guitarists
Hungarian male musicians